Grand Lady Heonmok of the Gyeongju Pyeong clan was the daughter of Pyeong-Jun who became the 7th wife of Taejo of Goryeo and mother of Prince Sumyeong. From all of Taejo's wives and consorts, just she who held the highest title but still below the queen, which indicated that her father made an important contribution to established the new Goryeo Dynasty and possibility that he was probably a behind-the-scenes figure who promoted Silla's noble wealth couldn't be ruled out. Though her son, Heonmok became the great-grandmother of Queen Seonjeong.

References

External links
헌목대부인 on Encykorea (In Korean).

Year of birth unknown
Year of death unknown
Consorts of Taejo of Goryeo
People from Gyeongju